Driving etiquette refers to the general courtesy and rules communities expect drivers to follow. The term dates back to the early 1900s and the use of horse-drawn carriages.
Driving etiquette typically involves being courteous and staying alert, which varies by vehicle, situation and location (e.g., etiquette for driving an F1 racecar has different rules than for driving an RV).  Failure to adhere to this behavior can cause an increased risk of road collisions, trauma and road rage.

Driving etiquette can extend beyond in-vehicle actions:  "When a courteous driver scrapes the fender or inflicts minor damage to a parked car without its owner present, he leaves a note giving his name, his telephone number, and the name of the insurance company. If the owner is present, the courteous driver exchanges insurance information politely and contacts the proper authorities right away without incident". Breaches in driving etiquette can often be addressed amiably with a simple and immediate expression of apology. Its guiding principle is "one good turn deserves another", and is considered a vital part of responsible driving.
Speeding and aggressive driving, examples of poor driving etiquette, have been cited as negative factors related to rural highways. Drivers need driving etiquette education to lower the risk of causing accidents.

Driving etiquette by country
Motorists in the United States and northern Europe are described as "predictably law-abiding", while drivers in Russia and India are referred to as driving in a "madcap road-rally style".

Chile
"Many Chileans have tendency to speed, pull out of lanes without signaling, and rarely demonstrate driving etiquette when it comes to cyclists".

China
People have driven vehicles for well over 3,000 years in China.
As a result, traffic can at times be chaotic, and some road courtesies are often ignored.  Taxi and bus drivers will commonly aim their vehicles at pedestrians in order to get them to move out of the way more quickly, with regular honking of car horns as the norm.

France
In France, it is common for drivers to nudge other vehicles to fit into a tight parking space. Alcohol limit: For drivers and riders that have less than three years of experience, the alcohol limit is 0.2 grams per liter.

Germany
After analyzing the culture of German driving, "taking all this into consideration, it is not surprising that the Germans developed a driving etiquette that varies from the American. The German driver is aggressive".

In Germany, it is common for a wedding parade to honk the vehicles horns en route. Drivers on the autobahn will flash their lights if a vehicle in front is driving too slowly.

Guatemala
Loud honking, always ceding the way to vehicles traveling on uphill mountainous passes and passing on blind curves is considered normal driving etiquette in Guatemala.

India
Hyderabad has "what could be considered the worst driving etiquette in the country".

Jamaica
In Jamaica, drivers will honk their horn to say thank you if let out at a junction.

Kenya
It is considered good etiquette in Kenya to honk your horn to warn other vehicles of rocks or debris on the road ahead.  Turn signals are commonly used to indicate if a driver wishes to be overtaken or not. At night, some drive with their right indicator on so as to show you the extended width of their cars to avoid collision on the narrow roads.

Macedonia
Few Macedonians wear a seat belt, even though it is illegal not to in that country, or "follow any form of land discipline and driving etiquette".

New Zealand
New Zealand drivers generally follow the road rules, it is acknowledged that driving etiquette could be improved. Drivers observe lane lines and give way rules, indicate changes of direction and (mostly) adhere to speed limits. Drivers are courteous and will allow other road users to merge but tend to be impatient.

Puerto Rico
Puerto Rico's driving "tends towards mild anarchy". Speeding past traffic on the shoulder of a road is "perfectly acceptable". After letting ambulances or police cars overtake them, it is common for drivers to heavily tailgate that car. "Merging into a thoroughfare from a side road is simply a matter of nosing your automobile into traffic until a generous fellow traveler waves you in or until you force them to a screeching halt".

Turkey
In Turkey, flashing of headlights is commonly used to indicate that the driver intends to go first.

South Africa
A "strange but pleasant bit of South African driving etiquette" involves "pulling over onto the tarred hard shoulder to let the car behind overtake in safety". This is done regardless of whether there is traffic or not. The overtaker is expected to flick their hazard lights as a sign of saying thanks.

South Korea
Recently, South Korea has improved its driving etiquette. It has been suggested that it is as if South Korea is learning how to be a modern country.

Spain
In Spain, drivers flash their lights to warn other drivers they are about to conduct an overtaking maneuver.

United Kingdom
British driving etiquette includes:
 letting in / out other drivers
 pulling in behind parked cars, when the road ahead is too narrow for two cars to pass.

Although the Highway Code advises against flashing a vehicle's lights in most situations, many drivers use it to communicate with other drivers, such as to let them in to a stream of traffic. Due to this disconnect between rules and practice, some scammers use flashing lights to scam other drivers for insurance money, by making them think they are being let out.

United States
72% of Americans believe that driving etiquette has declined over the last 10 years; however, nowhere near enough to be considered as chaotic as in countries like Russia and India.

Examples of bad driving etiquette
The following acts are commonly cited as examples of bad driving etiquette. In many cases, while the action does not pose any actual threat, it is considered to be a pet peeve of many drivers.

"Nudging" pedestrians
Involves drivers coaxing pedestrians who are trying to cross a crosswalk by honking or crowding them.

Elongated/excessive honking 
Honking is acceptable in certain situations, however it becomes excessive when it involves, for instance, honking at a car that is already signaling to make a turn, or at a car with the hazards blinking (the car may be in poor mechanical shape or there is a problem on the road ahead of the driver). Also involves honking when there are other cars in front of the car in front of you, or at a red light. It is sometimes used to bully other drivers into increasing their speed, especially when they are already at or over the speed limit, but in this instance, it is also accompanied by tailgating. This is normally used by aggressive, high-strung drivers.

Tailgating
Involves driving dangerously close to the vehicle ahead (often in an attempt to encourage them to increase their speed).  This action can distract the operator of the forward vehicle and reduces the stopping time of the rear vehicle in case of sudden speed changes. This is generally used by aggressive drivers. Additionally, this may affect the driver of the forward car emotionally, sometimes to the point the offended driver may consider soaring to illegal speeds in an attempt to escape, which in turn creates an additional aggressive driver.

Double parking
Double-parked vehicles can disrupt traffic flow, causing other motorists to navigate their way around them.

Driving in busy areas with high beams on
At night this action can blind oncoming traffic, making it more difficult for vehicles to safely follow the road.  When following another vehicle, glare from this action can reduce the effectiveness of the forward vehicle's mirrors — reducing situational awareness and increasing the likelihood of an accident.

Refusing to yield right-of-way to other vehicles
Merging vehicles must accelerate or brake unsafely or can be forced off the road at the end of a merging lane due to this action.

Driving with loud, distracting music
Reduces the driver's ability to hear and react to noises around the vehicle (including emergency-vehicle sirens).

Driving a vehicle with snow and ice covering it
Can endanger others if the snow-covered vehicle reaches highway speeds and chunks of ice/snow fly off behind the vehicle.  Snow and ice can also slide down from the roof to block visibility from the rear window in the car, reducing the driver's situational awareness.

Changing lanes and turning without use of signals
Increases the likelihood of an accident by surprising other drivers with a lane change or turn unexpectedly.

Cutting off other motorists
Refers to a vehicle that enters a lane without proper caution, leaving a small amount of distance between other surrounding vehicles. This can be caused by unawareness of surroundings, impatience, and/or aggressiveness.

Driving below the speed of traffic in center or passing lanes'Causes a disruption in traffic flow as other vehicles must either slow to match the offending vehicle's speed, and may be forced to pass on the wrong side.

Slowly passing another vehicle/Using cruise control to pass a vehicle rather than accelerating
Causes a disruption for other vehicles in the passing lane for the duration of the time the passing car occupies it.

Distracted driving (includes talking/texting on the phone, smoking, drinking, and eating)
Reduces driver awareness of the road and the likelihood of collision increase has been linked to drunk driving.

Pet peeves
Although in some cases they pose no actual threat or danger, some actions are seen as unpleasant or pet peeves and thus classified as bad driving etiquette.

Ed Janicki of the October 1981 issue of Scouting, cites the following as driving pet peeves: 
drivers ahead of [him] who do not use turn signals before making a turn
teenage drivers who blare out music on the radio while they wait at a stop sign
women who apply lipstick at a red light
drivers who park in the middle of a yellow line ... taking up two car spaces
vans that tailgate [him] on the freeway
drivers who zigzag from left lane to middle lane to right lane...and exceed the speed limit because they're behind schedule

Vicky DeCoster, author of The Wacky World of Womanhood'', cites "driving around the parking lot for an hour in order to get the closest spot" and insinuating that constantly pressing down on the pedal counts as exercise as driving pet peeve of hers.

The poem "Car Complaints and Pet Peeves", by Michael Burdick, expresses the perspective of a car which explains how certain pet peeves cause it to "rust" and "overheat" etc. The piece mentions the following as driving pet peeves:
traffic jams
cars stopping traffic to allow cars to enter traffic
cars not following zipper method when merging
parking-lot induced dents and scratches
people who drive irresponsibly and use their handicap plates as an excuse
pulling out in front of fellow drivers
driving well below the posted speed limits
weaving from lane to lane
driving too close to the centreline
terrible roads
flying debris from uncovered trucks
litter on the road
people blinding oncoming traffic with headlights

See also
Etiquette
Rules of the road

References

Driving
Etiquette by situation
Rules of the road